Chrzanowice may refer to:

Chrzanowice, Radomsko County
Chrzanowice, Sieradz County
Kolonia Chrzanowice

See also
Chrzan
Chrzanów (disambiguation)
Chrzanowo (disambiguation)
Chrzanowski